Maracaju may refer to:

 Maracaju, Mato Grosso do Sul, Brazil
 Maracaju Mountain Range, Mato Grosso do Sul, Brazil
 Maracaju Atlético Clube, football club